Colorado Conservation Voters (CCV) is an environmental organization that works to turn conservation values into Colorado policy. Its mission is to make environmental protection a priority for voters, political candidates, and elected officials in Colorado. CCV educates the public about the conservation positions of candidates and elected officials and holds elected officials accountable for their environmental records. CCV is a 501(c)4 organization and was formed in 1998.

In its role as a watchdog organization, CCV produces the Colorado Legislative Environmental Scorecard at the close of each Legislative Session. The scorecard provides nonpartisan, factual information on how each member of the Colorado Legislature voted on a range of environmental issues. The scorecard is produced in consultation with an Advisory Committee of environmental experts from across the state. CCV hosts a session tracking system on their website, enabling Coloradans to evaluate their representatives before the close of the legislative year.

CCV has a history of success in Colorado's electoral politics with 19 out of 26 endorsed candidates winning their races in 2008. In 2006, 48 of its 51 endorsed candidates won their races. In 2004, 40 of CCV's 44 endorsed candidates went on to win.

After merging with the Colorado Environmental Coalition in 2013, the group renamed itself as Conservation Colorado, becoming the state's largest conservation organization.

References

External links 
 

Environmental organizations based in Colorado
Politics of Colorado
Environmental organizations established in 1998